Castle Hill High School is a community Special education School located in Offerton, Stockport, Greater Manchester. It is run by Stockport Metropolitan Borough Council and caters for pupils with moderate learning difficulties and complex needs, aged 11–18. It currently has about 180 pupils on roll. The school was awarded an "outstanding" rating by Ofsted in October 2013 and May 2017. The school moved to this site in September 2014, having previously been located in the Brinnington area of Stockport. The Brinnington site was closed to make way for a housing development, as the closure of the adjacent Lapwing Sports Centre meant that the school had no sports or catering facilities. The new building is on the site of Offerton School which closed in August 2007. The site is shared with Stockport Music Service

References

External links 
Official Website
Parents hit out after the opening of Castle Hill High School is delayed by a week
Stockport Council – Castle Hill High School Consultation Frequently Asked Questions
Stockport Metropolitan Borough Council
Ofsted
Edubase

Schools in Stockport
Special schools in the Metropolitan Borough of Stockport
Community schools in the Metropolitan Borough of Stockport
Special secondary schools in England